Michel de Pure, abbott, (Lyon, 1620 – Paris, March 1680) was chaplain and adviser to King Louis XIV of France (named as such in 1647). Author, translator, he notably wrote a manual on dancing as well as books criticizing the development of préciosité. He was also appointed historiographer of France in 1653.

His name, more than the character, remains attached to the mockery which Nicolas Boileau covered him with. However, in his day, he was recognized for his scholarship.

If Michel de Pure was best known for his valuable book on dance and ballets de cour of his time, Idée des spectacles anciens et nouveaux (Paris, Michel Brunet, 1668), we now know, thanks to the research work of Lise Leibacher-Ouvrard and Daniel Maher, that he also was one of the first authors of science fiction novels, Épigone, histoire du siècle futur (1659), recognized as "the first true uchrony".

Works

Translations 
1663: Quintilian
1665: L'Histoire des Indes by Giovanni Pietro Maffei
 Vie de Pope Leo X
 Vie de Paolo Giovio

Own works 
1658: Le Roman de la précieuse, ou les Mystères de la ruelle, Paris : G. de Luyne, (1st, 2nd, 3e and 4th parts at Gallica).
1663: , auctore M. D. P. (M. de Pure), Paris : A. Vitré.
1668: , Paris : M. Brunet. Reprint Geneva: Minkoff, 1972.
1673: La Vie du mareschal de Gassion, Paris : G. de Luyne, 4 vol.

He also composed some theatre plays:
1658: Ostorius, tragedy (text online at Gallica).
1659: La Déroute des précieuses, mascarade

Bibliography 
 Lise Leibacher-Ouvrard, Daniel Maher, Épigone, histoire du siècle futur (1659) Par Michel de Pure, Presses de l’Université Laval, 2005 (réédition de l’œuvre de Michel de Pure, accompagnée d’une étude universitaire)

References 

17th-century French male writers
17th-century French dramatists and playwrights
Historiographers
Historical dance
17th-century Latin-language writers
Clergy from Lyon
1620 births
1680 deaths
Writers from Lyon